Plan 9 is a 2015 independent science fiction-comedy horror film written and directed by John Johnson, and is homage, and partial remake of the cult 1959 B-movie Plan 9 from Outer Space (widely considered one of the worst movies of all time). It stars Brian Krause, Mr. Lobo, Monique Dupree and Camille Keaton, with appearances by Internet personalities Aaron Yonda, Matt Sloan, James Rolfe and actor Conrad Brooks, who appeared in the original film and was a member of director Ed Wood's regular acting company. Initially intended for 2008 theatrical release, it was released on DVD and Blu-Ray in Australia and New Zealand in February 2015, and on video on demand in North America approximately one year later.

Cast 
 Brian Krause as Jeff Trent
 Mr. Lobo as Criswell
 Matthew Ewald as Jimmy
 Monique Dupree as Becky
 James Rolfe as Officer Cop Policeman
 Aaron Yonda as Toby
 Matt Sloan as Sammy
 John Johnson as Patrolman Kelton
 Camille Keaton as Grandma
 Conrad Brooks as Jamie
 Addy Miller as Sarah
 Sara Eshleman as Lucy Grimm
 Amy B. Donahue as Zombie
 Jacob Baldwin as Zombie (Rear Cover Credit)

Reception 
Screen Anarchy reviewed the film, stating that "Plan 9 can stand on its own as a cheesy B-movie and it goes down well with friends, beer and pizza in tow, in a double bill with its forefather. For a no-budget amateurish production, the original has earned a place in history that actually merits remakes. Ed Wood would definitely approve." Glenn Cochrane of Scream magazine also reviewed Plan 9, writing "PLAN 9 has its moments but they’re few and far between and with an inconsistent pitch and a lacklustre delivery it proves to be a disjointed and uninspiring exploit of a B-movie classic." Dread Central rated the film at 3 1/2 stars, commenting that "There is no point to the existence of Plan 9 other than to make fans of the original Plan 9 from Outer Space smile ear-to-ear in appreciation."

References

External links
 
 
 

2015 films
American independent films
Horror film remakes
2010s English-language films
2010s American films